Michael Haughney (10 December 1925 – 22 February 2002) was a Scottish footballer who played for Celtic and represented Scotland once.

Haughney served in the Seaforth Highlanders during the Second World War, attaining the rank of captain.

References

Sources

External links

1925 births
2002 deaths
Footballers from Paisley, Renfrewshire
Sportspeople from Midlothian
People from Dalkeith
Seaforth Highlanders officers
British Army personnel of World War II
Alumni of the University of Edinburgh
Scottish emigrants to the United States
Association football fullbacks
Scottish footballers
Celtic F.C. players
Scotland international footballers
Scottish Football League players
Scottish Football League representative players
Scottish Junior Football Association players
Newtongrange Star F.C. players
Scotland B international footballers